Islamabad Convent Schools (ICS) are two high school in Islamabad, Pakistan under the administration of Catholic Church. and this school has two branches, F-8/4 and H-8/4. The school in F-8/4 has classes till six and the one in H-8/4 has more classes than F-8/4. The current principal is Sr 
Parveen Lal and the principal of F-8/4 is Sr Catherine Mehenga

References

Schools in Islamabad